Lieutenant-Colonel the Hon. Sir Piers Walter Legh  (12 December 1890 – 16 October 1955) was a British Army officer and a senior member of the Royal Household.

Life
Second son of the 2nd Baron Newton and Evelyn Caroline Bromley Davenport, Legh was educated at Eton and the Royal Military College, Sandhurst before being commissioned into the Grenadier Guards.

He served as a Military Secretary during the First World War, being mentioned in despatches. In 1919, he was appointed Equerry to the Prince of Wales until 1936 and then to King George VI from 1937 to 1946 (and then as Extra Equerry from 1946 to 1955).

In 1941, Legh became Master of the Household, a post he held until his retirement in 1953. He was invested as a Knight Grand Cross of the Royal Victorian Order in 1948. He was also a Justice of the Peace for London and Berkshire.

On 15 November 1920, he married Sarah Polk Shaughnessy (d. 1955, née Bradford), the widow of Capt. Hon. Alfred Shaughnessy and they had one daughter, Diana Evelyn Legh (b. 1924), who was the first wife of John Wodehouse, 4th Earl of Kimberley.

See also
Baron Newton
Leghs of Lyme

References

External links
 www.burkespeerage.com

1890 births
1955 deaths
Grenadier Guards officers
Graduates of the Royal Military College, Sandhurst
People educated at Eton College
Equerries
Knights Grand Cross of the Royal Victorian Order
Knights Commander of the Order of the Bath
Companions of the Order of St Michael and St George
Companions of the Order of the Indian Empire
Masters of the Household
Officers of the Order of the British Empire
Younger sons of barons